Iran has submitted films for the Academy Award for Best International Feature Film regularly since 1994. Prior to the Islamic Revolution of 1979, Imperial Iran sent a single film in 1977.

Iran has submitted a total of twenty-six films for Oscar consideration and three films, Majid Majidi's Children of Heaven and Asghar Farhadi's A Separation and The Salesman, have received an Oscar nomination. Of the three films, A Separation and The Salesman won the award. Six of the submitted films were directed by Majidi and five of them were directed by Farhadi. Bahman Ghobadi and Reza Mirkarimi were each chosen to represent Iran at the Oscars on two occasions.

On 24 September 2012, the film A Cube of Sugar was selected as the Iranian entry for the Best Foreign Language Oscar at the 85th Academy Awards. However, on the same day the head of Iran's government controlled cinema agency called for a boycott of the Oscars due to the Innocence of Muslims video on YouTube that originated in the United States. Reuters reported that Iran's Culture and Islamic Guidance Minister Mohammad Hosseini had confirmed that Iran would boycott.

Submissions
The Academy of Motion Picture Arts and Sciences has invited the film industries of various countries to submit their best film for the Academy Award for Best Foreign Language Film since 1956. The Foreign Language Film Award Committee oversees the process and reviews all the submitted films. Following this, they vote via secret ballot to determine the five nominees for the award.

The Iranian nominee is selected each fall by a committee appointed by the Farabi Cinematic Foundation. Despite poor relations with the United States, Iran has participated in the US-based competition since 1994, missing only one year. They attempted to withdraw their 1995 submission The White Balloon after sending it to Hollywood, but AMPAS refused to accept the withdrawal.

All selected films were primarily in Persian, except for Ghobadi's two Kurdish language films and Farhadi's The Past which was in French.

Also in at least eleven occasions, films made by Iranian directors represented other countries: I Love Vienna/Austria, Persepolis/ France, For a Moment, Freedom/Austria, Baba Joon/Israel,  Utopia/Afghanistan, Under the Shadow/UK, Parting /Afghanistan, Yeva/Armenia, Border/Sweden, Holy Spider/Denmark and Winners/UK.

Below is a list of the films that have been submitted by Iran for review by the Academy for the award by year and the respective Academy Awards ceremony.

See also
List of Iranian Academy Award winners and nominees
List of Academy Award winners and nominees for Best Foreign Language Film
List of Academy Award-winning foreign language films
Cinema of Iran

Notes

References

External links
The Official Academy Awards Database
The Motion Picture Credits Database
IMDb Academy Awards Page
IMDb list of submitted films

Best Foreign Language Film Academy Award submissions by country
Lists of Iranian films